Theofanis "Fanis" Gekas (born 23 May 1980) is a Greek professional football official, coach and a former player, who played as a striker. He is the manager of Turkish fourth-tier TFF Third League club Akhisarspor, with the official title of technical director.

He has been the top goalscorer of Superleague Greece and the Bundesliga in previous seasons. Most of his career has been spent in those two countries and Turkey, but he has also played top-flight football in England and Spain.

At international level, Gekas represented Greece at two European Championships and as many World Cups, earning 78 caps between 2005 and 2014. He was the top goalscorer of the European section of 2010 FIFA World Cup qualification with 10 goals. With 24 goals for his national football team, he is Greece's third highest all-time goalscorer.

Club career

AEL
Gekas started his professional career in the summer of 1998 at his hometown-based club AEL (then of the Greek Second Division).

Kallithea
In the summer of 2001, and after three years at Larissa, he moved to Kallithea. In his first season with the club, Kallithea was promoted to the Greek top division. Gekas scored 14 goals in 26 league matches and became top goalscorer of the 2001–02 league. Also, Gekas in 87 second division matches with Larissa and Kallithea scored 30 goals.

Panathinaikos
After scoring 46 goals in 80 matches for Kallithea at second and first Greek divisions and Greek Cup, Gekas and the club agreed to a transfer to Panathinaikos during the 2005 winter break. At his new club, Gekas became top goal scorer of the Greek league in 2005 with 18 goals. He was called to the national squad, making his playing debut in the 2–0 World Cup qualifying rounds victory against Albania in March 2005. As a member of the national team, Gekas also participated in the Confederations Cup 2005. With Panathinaikos, Gekas scored 23 goals in 41 appearances. In the season 2005–06, Gekas made his debut in the UEFA Champions League and came second in the Greek top goalscorers list for the competition.

VfL Bochum
The 2. Bundesliga club VfL Bochum showed an interest in Gekas already by the spring of 2006, but Panathinaikos wanted €2 million for its forward.

In the summer of 2006, Panathinaikos signed Greek top scorer Dimitris Salpingidis from PAOK FC and, as part of the deal, Gekas was supposed to agree to a transfer to PAOK. Gekas refused and Panathinakos loaned Gekas out to VfL Bochum, which had just achieved promotion to the top division, for €300,000, with the German club having the option to buy out the rights for Gekas at the end of the season, if they were to remain in the top division, for another €700,000.

During the 2006–07 season, VfL Bochum was fighting against relegation, but within a short period Gekas became one of the stars of the team and popular among fans. His goals were celebrated with sirtakis from the stadium's loudspeakers. Coach Marcel Koller described him in November 2006 as their "life insurance", since Bochum not only avoided relegation but secured their place in the Bundesliga quite a few matchdays before the last. Gekas went on to finish the season as Bundesliga's top scorer, with a tally of 20 goals.

Bayer Leverkusen
At the end of April 2007, VfL Bochum agreed to transfer Gekas to Bayer 04 Leverkusen for the following season. The transfer deal was as follows: Bayer 04 Leverkusen would pay €700,000 at the end of the season to Panathinaikos, and, if Bochum were to be relegated, they would get €1.5 million from Leverkusen. If Bochum were to remain in the Bundesliga's First Division, they would get €4 million from Leverkusen.

Gekas' first game for Bayer Leverkusen was a friendly which Bayer won 15–1 with Gekas scoring seven of those 15. However, despite being the top scorer for Bayer Leverkusen in the 2007–08 season, Gekas was consistently dropped from the squad by coach Michael Skibbe, making mostly substitute appearances. Following an injury to teammate Dmitri Bulykin, Gekas was placed back into the starting XI and scored three goals in three games, including two more against Hamburg in a game which earned Leverkusen a quarter-final spot in the UEFA Cup in March 2008.

Portsmouth
On 2 February 2009, Gekas was loaned by Leverkusen to Portsmouth for the remainder of the 2008–09 season.

Gekas was brought in by manager Tony Adams with a view to a permanent deal. However, soon after the move, Adams was sacked and replaced by caretaker Paul Hart. Gekas was not given any games and went on to state his desire to leave the club, with Zenit St. Petersburg reportedly being interested in him.

On 11 April 2009, he came on as a substitute for one minute, replacing Jermaine Pennant in a 2–2 draw with West Bromwich Albion at Fratton Park in his only Portsmouth match. His loan period was terminated by Portsmouth on 21 May 2009 two weeks earlier than initially expected and he returned to Bayer Leverkusen.

Bayer Leverkusen
Gekas, while playing for his national team, became the top scorer in the European section of the qualification for 2010 World Cup. But in Leverkusen, he was competing with Stefan Kießling, Eren Derdiyok and Patrick Helmes for a place in the starting formation, and he failed to establish himself. He left the club after half a year.

Hertha
On 17 December 2009, Bayer Leverkusen signed a half-year loan of Gekas with Hertha BSC. In his first game for Hertha, Gekas scored in the team's 0–3 away win against Hannover 96 on 16 January 2010. Despite that promising start, Hertha continued to struggle at the bottom of the Bundesliga table. Gekas' most notable performance came on 21 March 2010, when he scored a hat-trick in the 1–5 away victory over German champions VfL Wolfsburg. Hertha eventually did not avoid relegation. Gekas ended up scoring 6 goals in 17 appearances for the club.

Eintracht Frankfurt
On 19 May 2010, Gekas signed a two-year contract with Eintracht Frankfurt. He scored 16 goals in 34 appearances but this did not prevent Eintracht from being relegated to the German second division.

Gekas left Eintracht under a cloud, after having not picked up the language during his almost six years in Germany. "I wonder how it is possible for somebody to be living in Germany for five years but not be willing to learn the language" said Eintracht legend Egon Loy. When Gekas was told about the criticism, he responded: "I am being paid to score goals, not to speak."

Later career
On 7 January 2012, Gekas signed a six-month contract with Süper Lig side Samsunspor. He scored his first goals against Orduspor, and scored a hat-trick two weeks later, in a game against Fenerbahçe.

In August 2012, Gekas moved to the Spanish La Liga, signing a two-year contract with Levante UD. He left the club on 27 November of the same year.

On 25 January 2013, Gekas signed a one and a half-year contract with Turkish Süper Lig side Akhisar Belediyespor, then struggling to avoid relegation. He scored a goal on his debut on 1 February 2013 against Kayserispor. Gekas went on to score 12 goals overall in the 15 games he played during the rest of the 2012–13 season. Akhisar avoided relegation.

On 5 September 2013, Gekas signed a one-year contract with Süper Lig club Torku Konyaspor, wearing the number 22 shirt.

On 26 July 2014, Gekas completed a return to his former club Akhisar Belediyespor, signing a two-year contract. On 3 April 2015, despite the fact that Gekas had no injury problems and was the top scorer of the club, he was left out of the squad in a surprise move by manager Roberto Carlos.

On 7 July 2015, Gekas signed a one-year contract with Süper Lig club Eskişehirspor. On 20 November 2015, Gekas left Eskişehirspor after his contract was cancelled by mutual consent.

On 1 February 2016, Gekas agreed to join Sion until the summer 2017 and to continue his career in Switzerland, after three years in Turkey. Six days later, in a Swiss Super League away win game against FC Zürich he made his debut with the club as a late substitute. On 17 February, he made his debut in the UEFA Europa League as a late substitute in a game against Sporting Braga for the round of 32. On 24 February 2016, Gekas' performance against Sporting Braga wasn't enough for Sion to qualify for the last 16 of UEFA Europa League. The Greek striker scores two amazing goals against the Portuguese team but his team didn't make it to the next round after 2–2 tie. On 27 February 2016, he scored a brace in a 3–2 home win against FC Luzern. On 23 April 2016, he scored a hat-trick in Sion's victory against FC Lugano, being the second scorer of the club in just 12 games. On 25 May 2016, he scored a brace in a 2–2 away draw against FC Luzern arrived at 10 goals in his first season in the Swiss Super League. On 27 August 2016, he opened the score in a 3–1 home win against FC Vaduz. It was his first goal for the 2016–17 season. On 29 October 2016, he netted two goals in his return in the first XI helping his club to reach a triumphic 5–1 home win against FC Lugano.

On 14 December 2016, Sivasspor officially announced the signing of Gekas till the summer of 2018, for an undisclosed fee. On 20 February 2017, he scored his first goal in the league at the very late minute of the game, giving his club a crucial 3–2 away win against Denizlispor in their effort to be promoted. On 19 March 2017, in a game against Şanlıurfaspor, he faced a dilatation joint in the medial side combined with damaged cruciate ligaments, thus forcing him to remain out of action for approximately 1–2 months. On 7 May 2017, he returned to the squad as a substitute in a 3–0 home win against Bandırmaspor.

International career

Gekas helped his country's team to reach UEFA Euro 2008 and also became the top scorer among the 2010 World Cup Qualifiers from UEFA nations with 10 goals. At the 2010 World Cup he helped the team to reach the team's first victory at a World Cup. Gekas is also fifth in the top scorer rankings of the Greece national team. On 9 September 2010, Gekas officially announced his decision to retire from the national team of Greece, due to "special circumstances inside the team", as he mentioned. This was the third player retirement after the departure of coach Otto Rehhagel, following Sotiris Kyrgiakos and Ioannis Amanatidis.

One year later, Gekas stated that it was a mistake for him to retire from the national team, thus making himself once again available to be selected by manager Fernando Santos.

He was part of the Greek squad at UEFA Euro 2012, where he played in every match and scored one goal in a 2–1 loss against the Czech Republic in the group stage, as his country reached the quarter-finals of the tournament.

At the 2014 FIFA World Cup, Gekas started the team's first match against Colombia, which ended in a 3–0 loss. Gekas came on a substitute in the subsequent games against Japan (a 0–0 draw) and Ivory Coast (a 2–1 victory), putting Greece through to the knockout stage of the World Cup for the first time. In Greece's round of 16 match against Costa Rica, Gekas came on as a substitute in the 69th minute and assisted Sokratis Papastathopoulos' 91st-minute equaliser with a shot that was parried into the defender's path by Keylor Navas. The match was decided by a penalty shootout, with Gekas the only player to miss in a 5–3 Costa Rican victory.

Gekas announced that a return to the Greece national team is not among his options: "The door of the Greece National Team is closed. I would like to thank all the people there whom I worked with the last decade and I hope that the current players can lead the team back to the former glories."

Personal life
Shortly after the 2008 European Championships, his wife Vasso gave birth to twins Nikolaos and Mikaela-Lamprini.

Career statistics

Club

International

International goals

Honours

Individual
Greek Super League top scorer: 2004–05 (18 goals)
Bundesliga top scorer: 2006–07 (20 goals)
2010 FIFA World Cup Qualifiers UEFA section top scorer

References

External links

 
 
 Article in German sports magazine kicker 
 

1980 births
Living people
Footballers from Larissa
Greek footballers
Kicker-Torjägerkanone Award winners
Association football forwards
Greece international footballers
2005 FIFA Confederations Cup players
UEFA Euro 2008 players
Super League Greece players
Football League (Greece) players
Athlitiki Enosi Larissa F.C. players
Kallithea F.C. players
Panathinaikos F.C. players
Greek expatriate footballers
Expatriate footballers in Germany
Bundesliga players
2. Bundesliga players
VfL Bochum players
Greek expatriate sportspeople in Germany
Bayer 04 Leverkusen players
Expatriate footballers in England
Premier League players
Portsmouth F.C. players
Greek expatriate sportspeople in England
Hertha BSC players
Eintracht Frankfurt players
Expatriate footballers in Turkey
Süper Lig players
TFF First League players
Samsunspor footballers
Sivasspor footballers
Expatriate footballers in Spain
La Liga players
Levante UD footballers
2010 FIFA World Cup players
UEFA Euro 2012 players
2014 FIFA World Cup players
Akhisarspor footballers
Greek expatriate sportspeople in Turkey
Konyaspor footballers
Eskişehirspor footballers
FC Sion players
Swiss Super League players
Greek expatriate sportspeople in Switzerland
Expatriate footballers in Switzerland
Greek football managers
Akhisarspor managers
Greek expatriate football managers
Expatriate football managers in Turkey